The Old Petaluma Opera House (also known as the Maclay Building) is a historic building located in downtown Petaluma, California.

History
It was built in 1870 as a theater, lecture hall, and dance hall. In 1901, the upper floors were converted to office and meeting space and the street level was remodeled for retail space, and a new prefabricated cast iron facade, manufactured by the Mesker Brothers company of St. Louis, Missouri was installed.

The Nielsen Furniture Company occupied the building from 1944 to 1960. As of June 2010, the building houses law offices and an Irish-style pub. It features Stick/Eastlake architecture.

It was listed on the National Register of Historic Places in 1978.

References

Buildings and structures in Sonoma County, California
Petaluma, California
Commercial buildings in California
Music venues completed in 1870
Theatres completed in 1870
National Register of Historic Places in Sonoma County, California
Theatres on the National Register of Historic Places in California
Beaux-Arts architecture in California
Stick-Eastlake architecture in California
Opera houses on the National Register of Historic Places in California